Tolib Ayombekov is a militant opposition politician and warlord in Tajikistan and alleged militia leader involved in the Gorno-Badakhshan clashes in 2012 against the government forces of ruling Tajik president Emomali Rahmon.

Ayombekov had been a warlord during the 1992 to 1997 Tajik Civil War between the United Tajik Opposition and the government led by President Rahmon Nabiyev. As part of subsequent peace deal between the opposing sides, Ayombekov was given a government post. However, Ayombekov and many other Tajik warlords were gradually driven out. Emomalii Rahmon's government has also accused Ayombekov of tobacco smuggling.

After Major-General Abdullo Nazarov, the head of the Tajik intelligence agency "GKNB" in the local semi-autonomous province of Gorno-Badakhshan, was dragged out of his car, and was fatally stabbed in an incident in Ishkoshim, heavy fighting erupted on 24 July 2012 between government forces and militants loyal to Ayombekov in the streets of Khorog. The Western media described the fighting as the worst in Tajikistan since 2010 or the 1992–1997 civil war. Ayombekov denied any responsibility for Nazarov's death.

References 

Living people
Tajikistani Sunni Muslims
Year of birth missing (living people)